The 2023 Northwestern Wildcats football team will represent Northwestern University in the West Division of the Big Ten Conference during the 2023 NCAA Division I FBS football season. The Wildcats expect to be led by Pat Fitzgerald in their 18th year as Northwestern's head football coach. They play their home games at Ryan Field in Evanston, Illinois.

Schedule

References

Northwestern
Northwestern Wildcats football seasons
Northwestern Wildcats football